Sky King was an American radio and television series. Its lead  character was Arizona rancher and aircraft pilot Schuyler "Sky" King.

The series had strong Western elements. King usually captured criminals and spies and found lost hikers, though he did so with the use of his airplane, the Songbird. Two twin-engine Cessna airplanes were used by King during the course of the TV series. The first was a Cessna T-50 and in later episodes a Cessna 310B was used till the series's end. The 310's make and model type number was prominently displayed during the closing titles.

King and his niece Penny lived on the Flying Crown Ranch, near the fictitious town of Grover, Arizona. Penny's brother Clipper also appeared during the first season. Penny and Clipper were also pilots, although they were inexperienced and looked to their uncle for guidance. Penny was an accomplished air racer, rated as a multiengine pilot, whom Sky trusted to fly the Songbird.

Radio synopsis 
The radio show began in 1946 and was based on a story by Roy Winsor, the brainchild of Robert Morris Burtt and Wilfred Gibbs Moore, who also created Captain Midnight. Several actors played the part of Sky, including Earl Nightingale, John Reed King, and Roy Engel. Jack Bivans played Clipper, and Beryl Vaughan portrayed Penny.

Radio premiums were offered to listeners, as was the case with many radio shows of the day. For example, the Sky King Secret Signalscope was used on November 2, 1947, in the Mountain Detour episode. Listeners were advised to get their own for only 15 cents and the inner seal from a jar of Peter Pan Peanut Butter, which was produced by the sponsor, Derby Foods. The Signalscope included a glow-in-the-dark signaling device, whistle, magnifying glass, and Sky King's private code. With the Signalscope, one could also see around corners and trees. The premiums were innovative, such as the Sky King Spy-Detecto Writer, which had a decoder (cipher disk), magnifying glass, measuring scale, and printing mechanism in a single package slightly over two inches long. Other notable premiums were the Magni-Glo Writing Ring, which had a luminous element, a secret compartment, a magnifier, and a ballpoint pen, all in the crown piece of a "fits any finger" ring.

The radio show continued until 1954, broadcasting simultaneously with the first portion of the television version.

Television synopsis 
The television version starred Kirby Grant as Sky King and Gloria Winters as Penny. Other regular characters included Sky's nephew Clipper, played by Ron Hagerthy, and Mitch the sheriff, portrayed by Ewing Mitchell. Mitch, a competent and intelligent law enforcement officer, depended on his friend Sky's flying skills to solve the harder cases. Other recurring characters included Jim Bell, the ranch foreman, played in four episodes by Chubby Johnson, as well as Sheriff Hollister portrayed by Monte Blue in five episodes, and Bob Carey, portrayed in ten episodes by Norman Ollestad.

After appearing in the first 19 episodes of the show, Hagerthy was drafted into the Army; the show saying Clipper had joined the Air Force. Leaving the army in 1955, he was more interested in motion pictures than rejoining the show. Unlike Grant and Winters, he never made any personal appearances for the show.

Many of the story lines would feature the supporting cast repeatedly finding themselves in near-death situations and the hero rescuing them with seconds to spare. Penny would particularly often fall into the hands of spies, bank robbers, and other ne'er-do-wells.

Sky never killed the villains, as with most television cowboy heroes of the time. Sky King was primarily a show for children, although it sometimes broadcast in prime time. The show also became an icon in the aviation community. Many pilots, including American astronauts, grew up watching Sky King and named him as an influence.

Plot lines were often simplistic, but Grant was able to bring a casual, natural treatment of technical details, leading to a level of believably not found in other TV series involving aviation or life in the Western United States. Likewise, villains and other characters were usually depicted as intelligent and believable, rather than as two-dimensional. The writing was generally above the standard for contemporary half-hour programs, although sometimes critics suggested that the acting was not.

Later episodes of the television show were notable for the dramatic opening with an air-to-air shot of the sleek, second Songbird banking sharply away from the camera and its engines roaring, while the announcer proclaimed, "From out of the clear blue of the Western sky comes Sky King!" The short credit roll which followed was equally dramatic, with the Songbird swooping at the camera across El Mirage Lake, California, then pulling up into a steep climb as it departed. The end title featured a musical theme, with the credits superimposed over an air-to-air shot of the Songbird, cruising at altitude for several moments, then banking away to the left.

The show also featured low-level flying, especially with the later Songbird, highlighting the desert flashing by in the background.

Cast 
 Kirby Grant as Schuyler "Sky" King
 Gloria Winters as Penny King
 Ewing Mitchell as Sheriff Mitch Hargrove
 Ron Hagerthy as Clipper King
 Gary Hunley as Mickey (final season)

Recurring cast 
 Norman Ollestad as Bob Carey
 Chubby Johnson as Jim Bell
 Monte Blue as Sheriff Hollister
 Terry Kelman as Davey Wilson

Guest stars 

 Stanley Andrews
 Richard Beymer
 James Brown
 Stephen Chase
 Gary Clarke
 Mason Alan Dinehart
 Herman Hack
 Darryl Hickman
 Ed Hinton

 I. Stanford Jolley
 Ted Jordan
 Fred Krone
 Walter Maslow
 Gregg Palmer
 James Parnell
 Sammee Tong
 Robert Rockwell
 Frank J. Scannell
 Jill St. John
 Boyd Stockman
 Glenn Strange
 Carol Thurston
 Lee Van Cleef

Episodes

Season 1

Season 2

Season 3

Season 4

Production 
A unique introduction featured the triangular Nabisco logo flying across the screen, accompanied by the sound of the Songbird flying past. Nabisco included plastic figures of characters from the show and the Songbird in packages of Wheat Honeys and Rice Honeys breakfast cereals.

The show's budget was $9,000 per episode.

The series was set in Arizona, but exteriors were actually filmed in the high desert of California at the Iverson movie ranch in Chatsworth and in the desert outside of Indio, California. Interiors were shot at General Service Studios in Hollywood. Grant recalled they filmed two episodes per week on a 2 1/2-day shooting schedule.

The ranch house used for exterior shots of the Flying Crown Ranch is an actual residence in Apple Valley, California, although it has been extensively remodeled since its use as headquarters of the ranch. Other locations were shot in and around Apple Valley and the nearby San Bernardino Mountains, George Air Force Base, and Naval Air Weapons Station China Lake.

It was expensive for a children's show, but most of the budget went into aircraft, vehicles, fuel, and sets. This meant that some standard production methods had to be abandoned, giving the series a more realistic look. For instance, in some shots, pilot Bill Fergusson actually did taxi the 310B rather than the more common (but time-consuming and costly) method of simulating movement by towing or dolly shots. Plymouth provided several 1951 woodie station wagons for the series.

The show was filmed and shown during three periods as sponsors changed: 1951–1952 (Derby Foods), 1955–1956 and 1957–1962 (Nabisco, though the copyright notices continued to name Derby Foods). It continued in syndication for years afterward, and was a staple on Saturday morning television into the mid-1960s.

The musical score was largely the work of composer Herschel Burke Gilbert.

Nabisco sold the series complete with all rights to Kirby Grant in 1959. In later years, Grant considered bringing back the series and even a "Sky King" theme park, but nothing ever happened on either of these projects. At least one writer has boilerplated a Sky King film, but none has been produced.

Aircraft 

King originally flew a Cessna T-50 Bobcat, a twin-engine wooden-framed airplane some called the "Bamboo Bomber". The craft was a World War II surplus UC-78B, owned by legendary Hollywood pilot Paul Mantz and flown by employees of his Paul Mantz Aerial Services for filming the flying sequences. At least two other T-50s are known to have been used for on-ground and in-the-cockpit scenes. The T-50 was grounded after episode 39 due to rot in the wooden frame. Songbird I was de-registered by the FAA in March 2018.

The best-known Songbird was a 1957 twin-engine Cessna 310B used in episodes 40 through 72. It was the second production 310B (tail number N5348A), provided by Cessna at no cost to the producers and piloted by Cessna's national sales manager for the 310, Bill Fergusson. Fergusson got the job after the motion picture pilot already selected was deemed unqualified to land the airplane at some of the off-airport sites required. Some months after a library of stock footage had been compiled, additional sequences were filmed using a different airplane. Cockpit sequences were filmed using the static test fuselage, also provided by Cessna.
The original 310B was eventually destroyed in a crash at Delano, California, in 1962, which killed its owner-pilot. A 1962 310D took its place. A third 310, “Song Bird III,” was used for publicity photos. It is still flying today, making appearances at airshows in a modified Sky King livery.

The budget issue also forced the frequent reuse of aircraft stock footage, sometimes "flopped" (i.e., reversing the flight position) in post-production, to show airplanes banking in the opposite direction. In these cases letters and numbers (especially wing and tail numbers) read backwards.

The monotone black-and-white film disguised the actual color scheme of the Cessna 310B, which was painted in a rich multi-color pattern of Coronado Yellow, Sierra Gold, and White, with a gold interior.

As opposed to rear projection showing the sky outside of the mockup airplane’s windows, the show utilised scrim on a metal frame with clouds painted on it that would be rolled past the cockpit windows. Hagerthy claimed that if the scene was long, the same clouds would pass by in the other direction.

Release

Broadcast 
The television show was first broadcast on Sunday afternoons on NBC-TV between September 16, 1951, and October 26, 1952. These episodes were rebroadcast on ABC's Saturday morning lineup the following year from November 8, 1952 through September 21, 1953 when it made its prime-time debut on ABC's Monday night lineup. It was telecast twice-a-week in August and September 1954, before ABC cancelled it. New episodes were produced when the show went into syndication in 1955. The last new episode, "Mickey's Birthday", was telecast March 8, 1959. Thereafter, Sky King surfaced on the CBS Saturday schedule in reruns until September, 1966.

Syndication 
CBS began airing reruns of the show on early Saturday afternoons (at 12 pm Eastern/Pacific times; late Saturday mornings at 11 am Central/Mountain times) on October 3, 1959, and continued to do so until September 3, 1966.  The CBS reruns were sponsored by Nabisco.

Home media 
All 72 episodes of the TV series have been released on DVD in North America, available from Sky King Productions.

References

External links 

 Missoula City Website states Kirby Grant was a pilot
 
 
 Celebrity Pilots, Famous Pilots, Darren Smith, Flight Instructor, CFI Homepage This Web site list famous actors that were pilots with no FAA records on file; Kirby Grant is listed as a pilot with no FAA records on file.
Bill Bryson's The Life and Times of the Thunderbolt Kid
 Sky King's Final Landing

1946 radio programme debuts
1954 radio programme endings
1940s American radio programs
1950s American radio programs
1950s American drama television series
1951 American television series debuts
1959 American television series endings
ABC radio programs
American Broadcasting Company original programming
American adventure television series
American radio dramas
Aviation television series
Black-and-white American television shows
CBS original programming
English-language television shows
Fictional aviators
NBC original programming
Television shows set in Arizona
Television shows filmed in California
Western (genre) radio series
1950s Western (genre) television series